Passion is the fourth studio album by American singer Jennifer Rush, released in November 1988.

Background
Following on from the success of her previous album Heart over Mind, Rush continued working with much of the same team of writers and producers. Passion, however, failed to find the same high level of success and didn't chart at all in the UK. Despite this, sales were satisfying in her most successful market, Germany, where the album reached No.3 and was certified platinum. The lead single "You're My One and Only" became a hit, but further releases "Keep All the Fires Burning Bright" and "Love Get Ready" did little to generate interest.

Single success did come a few months later in the UK, when a duet with Plácido Domingo, "Till I Loved You", became a hit in the summer of 1989. The record company however failed to capitalise on this by not repromoting the album.

Notable tracks on this album include "Same Heart" - a duet with Michael Bolton, although this came a year before his international breakthrough (another opportunity for repromotion), and "Remind My Heart" which is a collaboration with producer Jellybean Benitez who was then at the peak of his fame.

Track listing 

 Spanish LP copies of the album replace "You're My One and Only" and "Keep All the Fires Burning Bright" with Spanish re-recordings of both songs titled "Vida De Mi Vida" and "Solitaria Mujer". Spanish CD copies also include the original English versions as additional tracks at the end of the album.

Charts

Weekly charts

Year-end charts

Certifications

References

External links

1988 albums
Jennifer Rush albums
Albums produced by Keith Forsey
Albums produced by Michael Omartian
CBS Records albums